This is a list of ambassadors of the United States to the Federated States of Micronesia.

Following World War II, the Federated States of Micronesia, along with several other island nations, were part of the United Nations Trust Territory of the Pacific Islands, under U.S. administration. Micronesia achieved independence in 1986. The United States recognized Micronesia immediately and established diplomatic relations. On November 3, 1986, the United States opened an Office of the U.S. Representative. The Representative, Michael Gordon Wygant, presented his credentials to the government of Micronesia on October 2, 1987. On September 20, 1989, the Office of the U.S. Representative was upgraded to embassy status. The first U.S. Ambassador to the Federated States of Micronesia, Aurelia E. Brazeal, presented her credentials on September 18, 1990.

Ambassadors

See also
Federated States of Micronesia – United States relations
Foreign relations of the Federated States of Micronesia
Ambassadors of the United States

References

United States Department of State: Background notes on Micronesia

External links
 United States Department of State: Chiefs of Mission for Micronesia
 United States Department of State: Micronesia
 United States Embassy in Kolonia

Micronesia, Federated States of
United States